Stuart Taylor (born 26 November 1974 in Glasgow) is a Scottish professional football former player and coach, who was most recently the head coach of Hamilton Academical. Taylor played for several clubs in Scotland, and Drogheda United in Ireland, between 1992 and 2009. He then became a coach, and has since managed Limerick and Hamilton Academical.

Club career
In July 2002 Taylor signed for Drogheda United and made his League of Ireland debut on the opening day of the 2002–03 League of Ireland season. In his next game he scored his first goal at Tolka Park.

Coaching career
Taylor began his coaching career at Hamilton Academical, where he joined as assistant manager to Billy Reid from 2007 to 2011, when the club won the Scottish First Division and promotion to the Scottish Premier League.

In August 2012, he joined Al-Khor Sports Club in Qatar as assistant manager to László Bölöni.

In January 2013, Taylor was appointed manager of Limerick on a three-year deal.

Taylor resigned as the manager of Limerick in July 2014. Taylor then joined Aston Villa in July 2014 as Under-23 head coach.

He joined Paul Lambert as first team coach at Wolverhampton Wanderers in November 2016. Taylor and most of Lambert's back-room staff left the club in May 2017. He once again joined up with Lambert as his assistant manager at Stoke City in January 2018. He left Stoke at the end of the 2017–18 season as Lambert also left the club. Taylor joined up with Lambert for the third time as his assistant manager at Ipswich Town in October 2018. He left Ipswich along with manager Paul Lambert in February 2021.

After a short spell with Ross County, Taylor became head coach of Hamilton Academical in August 2021. He left Hamilton in June 2022.

Career statistics

Managerial statistics

Honours
Airdrieonians
Scottish Challenge Cup: 2001–02

References

External links

1974 births
Living people
Footballers from Glasgow
Scottish footballers
Association football midfielders
St Mirren F.C. players
Airdrieonians F.C. (1878) players
Drogheda United F.C. players
Falkirk F.C. players
Partick Thistle F.C. players
St Johnstone F.C. players
Ross County F.C. players
Airdrieonians F.C. players
Hamilton Academical F.C. players
Scottish Football League players
League of Ireland players
Scottish expatriate footballers
Scottish expatriate sportspeople in Ireland
Expatriate association footballers in the Republic of Ireland
Scottish football managers
Limerick F.C. managers
League of Ireland managers
Aston Villa F.C. non-playing staff
Wolverhampton Wanderers F.C. non-playing staff
Stoke City F.C. non-playing staff
Ipswich Town F.C. non-playing staff
Scottish expatriate football managers
Ross County F.C. non-playing staff
Hamilton Academical F.C. managers
Scottish Professional Football League managers
Hamilton Academical F.C. non-playing staff